Boris Ya. Levit is a professor of statistics at Queen's University in Kingston, Ontario, Canada.

Career
Levit obtained his M.Sc. in mathematics from Moscow State University and his Ph.D. in statistics from Russian Academy of Science in 1975 (his advisor was Rafail Khasminskii). While at Moscow State University, he was influenced by many famous mathematicians of the era, including Andrei Kolmogorov.

Before undertaking a professorship at Queen's University, Levit spent several years lecturing in the United States. He has also spent nearly ten years in the Netherlands, as a professor of statistics at the University of Utrecht.

Well known internationally, Levit has made outstanding contributions to the field of statistics. His research has included statistical problems involving infinitely many parameters, as well as nonparametric statistics. In the 1980s, he discovered how to characterize high order approximation problems using the properties of corresponding elliptic differential operators. Levit was awarded a D.Sc. by Vilnius University for his use of differential geometry and partial differential equations in statistical research.

References

External links
Official site

Living people
Year of birth missing (living people)
Russian statisticians
21st-century Moldovan mathematicians
Canadian mathematicians
20th-century Moldovan mathematicians
Vilnius University alumni
Canadian statisticians
Academic staff of Queen's University at Kingston